It's On (Dr. Dre) 187 um Killa is the second EP released by rapper Eazy-E and the last be to released during his lifetime. It was released on October 19, 1993 by Relativity Records, Epic Records and Eazy-E's Ruthless Records, largely to answer Dr. Dre's debut solo album The Chronic, which, massively popular that year, repeatedly attacks Eazy. Eazy's most successful EP or LP, it sold 110,600 copies in its first week, and peaked at number 5 on the Billboard 200 as well as at number 1 on Top R&B/Hip-Hop Albums chart. In 1994, it was certified double-platinum, over 2 million copies sold. It remains the only Hip-Hop Gangsta Rap EP to go multiplatinum.

To follow up his 1992 LP 5150: Home 4 tha Sick, Eazy-E had planned a double album named Temporary Insanity. Yet to exploit Dre's spotlight and his May 1993 single "Fuck wit Dre Day", which mainly disses him, Eazy changed plans. On this EP, shots at Dre are absent from only three tracks: "Gimmie That Nutt",  "Any Last Werdz", and "Boyz-N-the-Hood (G-Mix)". The lead single, "Real Muthaphuckkin G's"—which, alike "Any Last Werdz", carried a music video—became Eazy's most successful single.

Track listing

Samples
"Real Muthaphuckkin G's"
"Eazy-Duz-It" by Eazy-E
"It's Funky Enough" by the D.O.C.
"Any Last Werdz"
"Gigolo" by the Fatback Band
"Still a Nigga"
"Take Me Just as I Am" by Lyn Collins
"Sneakin' in the Back" by Tom Scott and the L.A. Express
"Gimmie That Nutt"
"Green Acres" by Vic Mizzy, Eddie Albert and Eva Gabor
"Boyz-N-The-Hood" by Eazy-E
"Findum, Fuckum & Flee" by N.W.A
"Walk & Talk" by Syd Dale
"It's On"
"Eazy-Duz-It" by Eazy-E
"Ruthless Villain" by Eazy-E
"Nuthin' But a 'G' Thang" by Dr. Dre feat. Snoop Doggy Dogg
"Fuck Wit Dre Day (And Everybody's Celebratin')" by Dr. Dre
"Gangsta Gangsta" by N.W.A
"Boyz N Tha Hood (G-Mix)"
"Ruthless Villain" by Eazy-E
"Down 2 Tha Last Roach"
"Express Yourself" by N.W.A
"A Bitch Iz a Bitch" by N.W.A

Personnel

Tony Alvarez - additional engineer (track 1-2)
Lasse Bavngaard - producer (track 8)
Rasmus Berg - producer (track 8)
David Bett - art direction
Antoine Carraby - producer (track 4-5)
Kevyn "Shaki" Carter - featured artist (track 8)
Brian Cross - photography
Jesper Dahl - producer (track 8)
Brian Knapp Gardner - mastering
Jerry Heller - management
Arlandis Hinton - featured artist (tracks 2, 8)
Gregory Fernan Hutchinson - featured artist & producer (track 3)
Nicholas Kvaran - producer (track 8)
Jerry Long Jr. - featured artist (track 3, 8)
Henrik Milling - producer (track 7)
Donovan "The Dirt Biker" Sound - mixing & recording
Allan Wai - design
David Weldon - producer (track 1–2, 6)
Andre Desean Wicker - featured artist (track 2)
Eric "Eazy-E" Wright - main artist, artwork

Charts

Weekly charts

Year-end charts

Certifications

See also
List of number-one R&B albums of 1993 (U.S.)

Notes

References

Eazy-E albums
1993 EPs
Hip hop EPs
Epic Records EPs
Ruthless Records EPs
Albums produced by Rhythum D
Gangsta rap EPs
G-funk EPs
Albums produced by Cold 187um
Albums produced by DJ Yella